Hongzhi (14 January 1488 – 23 January 1506) was the era name of the Hongzhi Emperor, the tenth emperor of the Ming dynasty of China, and was used for a total of eighteen years. During the Hongzhi period, the Ming dynasty's political clarity and economy continued to develop. It was known in historiography as the "Hongzhi Restoration" (弘治中興).

On 19 June 1505 (Hongzhi 18, 18th day of the 5th month), the Zhengde Emperor ascended to the throne and continued to use. The era was changed to Zhengde in the following year.

Comparison table

Other regime era names that existed during the same period
 Vietnam
 Hồng Đức (洪德, 1470–1497): Later Lê dynasty — era name of Lê Thánh Tông
 Cảnh Thống (景統, 1498–1504): Later Lê dynasty — era name of Lê Hiến Tông
 Thái Trinh (泰貞, 1504): Later Lê dynasty — era name of Lê Túc Tông
 Đoan Khánh (端慶, 1504–1509): Later Lê dynasty — era name of Lê Uy Mục
 Japan
 Chōkyō (長享, 1487–1489): era name of Emperor Go-Tsuchimikado
 Entoku (延徳, 1489–1492): era name of Emperor Go-Tsuchimikado
 Meiō (明応, 1492–1501): era name of Emperor Go-Tsuchimikado and Emperor Go-Kashiwabara
 Bunki (文亀, 1501–1504): era name of Emperor Go-Kashiwabara
 Eishō (永正, 1504–1521): era name of Emperor Go-Kashiwabara

See also
 List of Chinese era names
 List of Ming dynasty era names

References

Further reading

Ming dynasty eras